Oswaldo Brenes Álvarez (August 5, 1942 – February 11, 2013) was the Roman Catholic bishop of the Diocese of Ciudad Quesada, Costa Rica.

Ordained to the priesthood in 1942, Brenes Álvarez was named bishop in 2008 and resigned in 2012.

Notes

1942 births
2013 deaths
21st-century Roman Catholic bishops in Costa Rica
Roman Catholic bishops of Ciudad Quesada